Jezera (Serbian Cyrillic: Језера) is a village in central Bosnia and Herzegovina.  Before the collapse and dissolution of Yugoslavia and the War in Bosnia and Herzegovina, 1992-1995, Jezera was administratively under the jurisdiction of Teslić, a municipality in central-northern Bosnia; after the war the village was administratively partly attached to the municipality of Zenica, to the south of Teslić.

Demographics 
The ethnic and religious structure of Jezera was disturbed by the war in Bosnia and Herzegovina.  Heavily populated by the Orthodox Christian inhabitants before the war, Jezera's demographic structure  drastically changed during and following the war.  To give an example, virtually the entire subvillage (Serbo-Croatian: zaseok, pl. zaseoci) Kusići, left their homes and the area.  Among the reasons for this exodus was the newly established geopolitical order in Bosnia an Herzegovina, and the administrative attachment of the village to Zenica.  The border between the two Bosnian "entities," i.e. the Federation of Bosnia and Herzegovina and Republika Srpska, runs through the village Jezera.

Before the war and the exodus of its population, the village of Jezera was composed of several subvillages:
 Đukići
 Đurići
 Jelići
 Kusići
 Mijići
 Nedići
 Panići

As is often the case with many other Bosnian toponyms, the names of villages and subvillages are the same as the last names carried by its inhabitants; e.g., the villagers of the subvillage Đukići (pl. of Đukić) would carry the same last name, Đukić.

Ethnic composition, 1991. census
total: 1,069

 Serbs - 1,063 (99.43%)
 Croats - 1 (0.09%)
 others and unknown - 5 (0.46%)

References

 Official results from the book: Ethnic composition of Bosnia-Herzegovina population, by municipalities and settlements, 1991. census, Zavod za statistiku Bosne i Hercegovine - Bilten no. 234, Sarajevo, 1991.

See also
 Teslić, Bosnia and Herzergovina.

Populated places in Zenica
Populated places in Teslić
Villages in the Federation of Bosnia and Herzegovina